Paper Lives is a 2021 Turkish drama film directed by Can Ulkay and written by Ercan Mehmet Erdem. The film stars Çağatay Ulusoy, Emir Ali Doğrul, Ersin Arıcı, Turgay Tanülkü and Selen Öztürk. It premiered on Netflix on March 12, 2021.

Plot
In an impoverished neighborhood of Istanbul, a friendly garbage collector, Mehmet, who after being homeless has a soft spot for the many homeless children in the area, discovers an eight-year-old boy hiding in his colleague's garbage bag. Mehmet is dedicated to reconnecting the boy with his family.

Cast
 Çağatay Ulusoy as Mehmet
 Emir Ali Doğrul as Ali
 Ersin Arıcı as Gonzales
 Turgay Tanülkü as Tahsin
 Selen Öztürk

Critical response
According John Serba from Decider, the film "starts strong, holds on pretty well, then blows it hard at the end".

References

External links
 
 
 

2021 drama films
Turkish drama films
2020s Turkish-language films
Turkish-language Netflix original films
Films shot in Turkey